Kakkothikkavile Appooppan Thaadikal (English:  Woolly pods of Kakkothikkavu) is a 1988 Malayalam-language drama film produced jointly by Ousepachan Vaalakuzhy and Fazil, directed by Kamal and written by Fazil. The film is heroine-oriented, in which Revathi and Ambika play the lead roles. The film features original songs composed by Ouseppachan, while cinematography was done by Vipin Mohan.

The film is pictured in rural locations such as Pandalam, Kudassanad and Venmony. The film includes many sequences in school settings and gypsy life. The film was a sleeper hit at the box office. Revathi won the Filmfare Award for Best Actress for her performance in this film.

Plot
The film is about two sisters who were separated in early childhood. One day, a beggar (V. K. Sreeraman) comes to their house and asks for some water. Leaving the young sister (Raasi) in the courtyard, the elder sister (Kaveri) goes to fetch water and returns to find the beggar vanished along with her sister.

The second part of the film progresses through the life of a schoolboy, Murali, who is scoffed at in his school because of his poor background. One day, Murali skips his studies and runs away with some gypsies. He becomes good friends with a gypsy girl whom he names Kakkothi (Revathi), after a local legend. Kakkothi is being hunted by a beggar who wants her for his nefarious purposes. In the meantime, Murali's school teacher Valsala (Ambika) enquires about Murali's background and recognizes his pitiable condition.

One day, the school teacher finds him and persuades him to stay at her own house and study. Later, Kakkothi comes across Murali and insists that as a friend, he should stay with her. After their tents are raided, Murali convinces her of the goodness of his school teacher and takes her to the teacher's house. On seeing the teacher's house, Kakkothi reminisces about her past. She finds her own childhood photo in the house. She was in fact the girl kidnapped by the beggar years ago. Frantic, she then runs away from the house. The beggar who is hunting her closes in on her. Just like the Kakkothi legend, she kills the beggar in self-protection. Both the sisters recognize each other and embrace in joy.

Cast
 Revathi as Lakshmi a.k.a. Vavachi, Kakkothi
 Renny as Murali
 Ambika as Valsala
 V. K. Sreeraman as Poovachu the evil beggar
 Krishnan Kutty Nair as Mathai aka Kalan Mathai
 M. S. Thripunithura as father of Valsala and Lekshmi
 Surasu as male beggar
 Philomina as female beggar
 Mela Raghu
 Kaveri as Young Valsala
 Raasi as Young Lakshmi (in Malayalam credited as Manthra)
 K. B. Ganesh Kumar
 Appa Haja

Soundtrack
The music was composed by Ouseppachan and the lyrics were written by Bichu Thirumala.

References

External links
 

1988 films
1980s Malayalam-language films
Films directed by Kamal (director)
Films scored by Ouseppachan